The Broken Skull Formation is a geologic formation in Quebec. It preserves fossils dating back to the Ordovician period.

There's another Broken Skull formation in the Mackenzie Mountains of Yukon, dating to the Cambrian-Ordovician, and comprising sandy limestones and dolomites.

See also

 List of fossiliferous stratigraphic units in Quebec

References

 

Ordovician Quebec
Ordovician northern paleotropical deposits